Anders Eggert Magnussen (born 14 May 1982) is a Danish handball coach and former player. He has previously played in Denmark for GOG and Skjern Håndbold, and german side SG Flensburg-Handewitt. He was part of SG Flensburg-Handewitt team that won the 2013–14 EHF Champions League trophy. In his 11 years with SG Flensburg-Handewitt he played in 461 matches and scored 2531 times.

National team
Eggert made his debut for the Denmark men's national handball team in 2003. He became European Champion with the Danish team after winning the 2012 Championship in Serbia, defeating the host nation in the final, 21–19. In 2011 he was a part of the team that won the silver medal at the World Championships in Sweden.

He competed in handball at the 2012 Summer Olympics.

Honours
EHF Champions League :
: 2014
: 2007
 EHF Cup Winner's Cup:
 : 2012
German Cup:
: 2015
German Super Cup :
: 2015
Danish Championship:
: 2004, 2018
Danish Handball Cup:
: 2003, 2005

Individual awards
 Top Scorer of the World Championship: 2013
 Top Scorer of the Handball-Bundesliga: 2011
 Top Scorer of the Håndboldligaen: 2019

References

External links 
 
 
 

1982 births
Living people
Danish male handball players
Olympic handball players of Denmark
Handball players at the 2012 Summer Olympics
SG Flensburg-Handewitt players
Handball-Bundesliga players
Expatriate handball players
Danish expatriate sportspeople in Germany
Sportspeople from Aarhus